Rise of the Northstar (abbreviated as ROTNS) is a French heavy metal and hardcore punk band from Paris. Formed in 2008, the band combines heavy metal, hip-hop, and hardcore punk with Japanese pop culture influences. The band currently consists of vocalist Vithia, lead guitarist Eva-B, rhythm guitarist Air One, bassist Yoru, and drummer Phantom with Vithia being the sole original member of the group. Rise of the Northstar has released two EPs, Tokyo Assault (2010) and Demonstrating My Saiya Style (2012), and two full-length albums, Welcame (2014) and The Legacy of Shi (2018).

History

2008–2010: Beginnings and Tokyo Assault
Rise of the Northstar was founded by vocalist Vithia in Paris, 2008. The band's name was inspired by the manga Fist of the North Star (北斗の拳 Hokuto no Ken). The original line-up consisted of Vithia on vocals, Nicolas "Diego" L. on lead guitar, Loïc "Bboy" Ghanem on rhythm guitar, Lucas on bass, and Max V on drums. In the summer of 2008, the band released a demo containing two tracks on their Myspace. In 2009, they recorded three more tracks for five days at the Studio Sainte-Marthe in Paris, and released them on January 12, 2010 along with the two tracks of the demo as their first EP titled Tokyo Assault. In the summer of 2010, lead guitarist Nicolas "Diego" L. and drummer Max V left the band and were replaced respectively by Eva-B and Hokuto no Kev.

2011–2012: Demonstrating My Saiya Style
In May 2011, Rise of the Northstar launched "Protect Your Japan" campaign following the 2011 Tōhoku earthquake and tsunami and Fukushima nuclear disaster that affected Japan on March 11 of the same year. They released an exclusive song titled "Phoenix" on June 20, 2011 on their bandcamp page in order to raise fund for the Japanese Red Cross. The band also made a video clip to make the campaign bigger. Shortly after, a new rhythm guitarist Air One joined the band to replace Loïc G who had left a few months earlier.

On July 23, 2012, the band released a second EP containing six tracks titled Demonstrating My Saiya Style. The EP was released as a single CD for the world, and as a special Japanese 2 CDs pack (including the new EP and Tokyo Assault) independently, and had sold out the first 2,000 copies. Two music videos were released from the EP: "Sound of Wolves" and the eponymous "Demonstrating My Saiya Style".

2013–2016: Welcame
At the beginning of 2013, bassist Lucas announced his departure, and replaced by Fabulous Fab. At the end of 2013, the band recorded their first full-length album Welcame, and created their own independent label, Repression Records. The release of the album was set for September 29, 2014, but postponed to November 24 of the same year following the agreement between the band and Nuclear Blast label. Welcame is a reference to the manga Rookies, considered by the band as their way to say welcome to new fans. Rise of the Northstar chose Zeuss to mixed and mastered the album, while they did the recording themselves: guitars at home, drums and vocals at Sainte Marthe Studio in Paris.

2017–2021: The Legacy of Shi and Live in Paris
In March 2017, the band announced they were working on a second studio album. Before starting the album recordings, drummer Hokuto no Kev left the band. In November 2017, they went to the Silver Cord Studio in New York to record the new album, produced by Joe Duplantier of Gojira. Following the recordings, the new drummer Phantom joined the band. On June 13, 2018, the band posted a teaser of their upcoming single "Here Comes The Boom," showing roughly 10 seconds of footage from the song. Exactly a month later on July 13, 2018, the band released it. They also released two other singles before the album released, which were "This is Crossover" in August and "Nekketsu" a week before the album's release alongside a vertical lyrical video. On October 19, 2018, The Legacy of Shi was released. According to lead guitarist Evangelion-B, the album tells the story of a Japanese spirit yōkai who possess and fight the band throughout 11 tracks. In the album, they used seven strings for the first time on half of the album, with a very low tuning, and mixed more musical styles into the album. On March 25, 2019, the band released a teaser for an upcoming music video on their YouTube Channel. The clip contains a count from 1-4 in Japanese and a 1 second clip of the intro riff for "The Legacy of Shi" song, signalling a new music video for that song to be released sometime in the future. Three days later, on March 28, 2019, the music video was officially released.

On June 19, 2020, a live EP was released, which was performed in Paris in May 2019. This EP includes six songs from their live set, and the vinyl/Japanese edition bonus song, "Sayonara" included as a seventh.

2022–present: Showdown
In December 2022 , the band announced that a new single would be released in January 2023. They also announced a new line-up, with a photo showing Vithia, Eva-B, the new bassist with his back turned, Air One, and a different, masked Phantom. This hinted at the departures of Fabulous Fab and Phantom (Thomas Pain). They have introduced their new drummer whose identity has yet to be revealed and new bassist, Yoru. 

Rise of the Northstar announced on January 20, 2023, that their third studio album would be called Showdown, set to be released on April 7. That same day, they also released the music video for new single "One Love".

Musical style, influences, and lyrical themes
Rise of the Northstar's musical style blends 90's New York hardcore with metal, hip-hop elements and Japanese pop culture, a mixture that the band itself calls as "crossover". The band are influenced by metal groups such as Rage Against the Machine, Slayer, Suicidal Tendencies, Machine Head, Pantera, and Biohazard, along with hip-hop acts Wu-Tang Clan, Onyx and Mobb Deep. Their lyrics speak about the reality of the band's lives through manga references, especially Fist of the North Star, Dragon Ball, Akira, Rookies and Great Teacher Onizuka.

Image
During the Demonstrating My Saiya Style and Welcame cycles, band members wore Japanese school uniforms gakuran with furyo (juvenile delinquent) style onstage: shorter jackets, huge pants and sneakers, which is totally forbidden at school in Japan. According to vocalist Vithia, "In some shōnen manga, you’ll see that furyos live their lives by their own rules, omitting the world around ’em. They run their lives as they want to, not as the society they live in would like! ROTNS is about that and our uniforms means that we are all five united with the same goals and against all the established code in this scene. We have our own codes, own rules, we create our own way". Currently, the band wears an original black uniform which has plenty of hints to shōnen manga that the band grew up with.

Band members

Current members
 Victor "Vithia" Leroy — vocals 
 Brice "Eva-B" Gauthier  — lead guitar 
 Erwan "Air One" Menez — rhythm guitar 
 Yoru — bass guitar 
 ? "Phantom (2)" ? — drums 

Former members
 Nicolas "Diego" Leroy — lead guitar 
 Max V. — drums 
 Loïc "Bboy" Ghanem — rhythm guitar 
 Lucas  — bass guitar 
 Kevin "Hokuto no Kev" Lecomte — drums 
 Fabien "Fabulous Fab" Lahaye — bass guitar 
 Thomas "Phantom (1)" Pain — drums

Timeline

Discography

Studio albums

Extended plays

Music videos

References

External links

 
 
 

2008 establishments in France
French hardcore punk groups
French metalcore musical groups
Musical groups established in 2008
Musical groups from Paris
Nuclear Blast artists
Rap metal musical groups